Justin Cooper (born August 31, 1997) in Cold Spring Harbor, New York is an American professional motorcycle racer who competes in AMA Supercross and Motocross.

Career
Cooper won the 2021 250cc West AMA Supercross Championship for Team Yamaha.

References

American motorcycle racers
1997 births

Living people